Kopylov House is a building in Zheleznodorozhny City District of Novosibirsk, Russia. It is located on Krasnoyarskaya Street. The building was constructed in 1901.

History
The Kopylov House was built in 1901 and belonged to Rodion Martemyanovich Kopylov, who headed the Union of the Russian People (Novonikolayevsk department).

Interior
The original round ovens are preserved in the interior of the building.

Gallery

See also
 Ikonnikova House
 Zedain House

References

External links
 Памятник деревянного зодчества по ул. Красноярская № 112. Novosibdom.ru.

Zheleznodorozhny City District, Novosibirsk
Buildings and structures in Novosibirsk
Houses completed in 1901
Cultural heritage monuments of regional significance in Novosibirsk Oblast